This article lists the results for the Denmark national football team from their first match against France in 1908 to the present day.

Key
F – Friendly match
NC – Nordic Football Championship match
OG – Olympic Games match
OT – Other tournament(s)

Results
Note that scores are written Denmark first

1900s, 1910s and 1920s

Between their first official match in 1922 and 1939, Denmark played 73 games. The first game of the Denmark national team was at the 1908 Summer Olympics on 19 October 1908 against a B team of France. The last game of the 1920s was on 13 October 1929 game against Finland, the 73rd game of the Danish national team.

1930s and 1940s

During the 1930 and 1940s, Denmark played 87 games. The first game of the 1930s was on 16 June 1930 game against Finland, the 74th overall Danish national team game. The last game of the 1940s was on 11 December 1949 game against Netherlands, the 162nd game of the Danish national team.

1950s

During the 1950s, Denmark played 72 games, winning 25, drawing 14, and losing 33. In these games, they scored 138 goals, while conceding 163 to their opponents. The first game of the 1950s was the May 28, 1950 game against Yugoslavia, the 162nd overall Danish national team game. The last game of the 1950s was the December 6, 1959 game against Bulgaria, the 233rd game of the Danish national team.

1960s

During the 1960s, Denmark played 91 games, winning 40, drawing 13, and losing 38. In these games, they scored 195 goals, while conceding 160 to their opponents. The first game of the 1960s was the May 26, 1960 game against Norway, the 234th overall Danish national team game. The last game of the 1960s was the October 22, 1969 game against Hungary, the 324th game of the Danish national team.

1970s

During the 1970s, Denmark played 97 games, winning 35, drawing 19, and losing 43. In these games, they scored 140 goals, while conceding 152 to their opponents. The first game of the 1970s was the May 9, 1970 game against Poland, the 325th overall Danish national team game. The last game of the 1970s was the November 14, 1979 game against Spain, the 421st game of the Danish national team.

1980s

During the 1980s, Denmark played 115 games, winning 56, drawing 22, and losing 37. In these games, they scored 187 goals, while conceding 119 to their opponents. The first game of the 1980s was the May 7, 1980 game against Sweden, the 422nd overall Danish national team game. The last game of the 1980s was the November 15, 1989 game against Romania, the 536th game of the Danish national team.

1990s

During the 1990s, Denmark played 102 games, winning 52, drawing 27, and losing 23. In these games, they scored 140 goals, while conceding 83 to their opponents. The first game of the 1990s was the February 5, 1990 game against United Arab Emirates, the 537th overall Danish national team game. The last game of the 1990s was the November 17, 1999 game against Israel, the 638th game of the Danish national team.

2000s

During the 2000s, Denmark played 109 games, winning 54, drawing 30, and losing 25. In these games, they scored 171 goals, while conceding 98 to their opponents. The first game of the 2000s was the March 29, 2000 game against Portugal, the 639th overall Danish national team game. The last game of the 2000s was the November 18, 2009 game against United States, the 747th game of the Danish national team.

2010s

See also
Football in Denmark
Denmark national football team statistics

References

Sources
 Landsholdsdatabasen at DBU.dk
 haslund.info